Tomislav "Tommi" Tomich (born 14 February 1980) is an Australian goalkeeper who plays for Sydenham Park.

Biography
Tomich has previously played with Bassendean Caledonians, Cockburn City, Melbourne Knights FC, Western Knights and a stint with Perth Glory in the 2000. In November 2006 Tomich joined Perth Glory as a replacement for injured keeper Jason Petkovic. His consistent performances had earned him a one-year deal until the end of the 2007–08 season as first-choice goalkeeper until Jason Petkovic recovered.

He was not offered another contract at Perth Glory and instead signed for local Perth club ECU Joondalup before moving to South Melbourne in 2008. In the same year he was loaned to Melbourne Victory FC in the A-League while Michael Theoklitos is injured and later to Adelaide United again for injury cover.

References

1980 births
Living people
Soccer players from Perth, Western Australia
Australian people of Croatian descent
Australian soccer players
Perth Glory FC players
Melbourne Knights FC players
Melbourne Victory FC players
Adelaide United FC players
South Melbourne FC players
A-League Men players
Association football goalkeepers